Luis Alfonso Abram Ugarelli (born 27 February 1996 in Lima, Peru) is a Peruvian professional footballer who plays as a centre-back for Major League Soccer club Atlanta United FC and the Peru national team.

Playing career
A Sporting Cristal youth player, Abram debuted in 2014 and that year won the "Newcomer of the Season Award."

On 31 July 2021, Abram joined to La Liga club 	Granada.
On 2 February 2023, Abram joined Major League Soccer outfit Atlanta United FC

International career
Born and raised in Peru, Abram was called up to the Peru U18s for the 2013 Bolivarian Games. Abram also made several appearances to the Peru U20 team. Abram debuted for the Peru national team in a 4–0 friendly win against Trinidad and Tobago in May 2016.

In May 2018, he was named in Peru's provisional 24 man squad for the 2018 World Cup in Russia. However, he did not make the final 23.

Career statistics

Club

International

Honours
Sporting Cristal
Peruvian Primera División: 2014, 2016

Cruz Azul
Supercopa de la Liga MX: 2022

References

1996 births
Living people
Footballers from Lima
Peruvian footballers
Association football defenders
Peruvian Primera División players
Sporting Cristal footballers
Argentine Primera División players
Club Atlético Vélez Sarsfield footballers
La Liga players
Granada CF footballers
Liga MX players
Cruz Azul footballers
Peruvian expatriate footballers
Peruvian expatriate sportspeople in Argentina
Peruvian expatriate sportspeople in Spain
Expatriate footballers in Argentina
Expatriate footballers in Spain
Expatriate footballers in Mexico
Peru youth international footballers
Peru under-20 international footballers
Peru international footballers
Copa América Centenario players
2019 Copa América players
2021 Copa América players